Lyria bondarevi is a species of sea snail, a marine gastropod mollusk in the family Volutidae, the volutes.

Description
The length of the shell attains 91.8 mm.

Distribution
This marine species occurs off the Mascarenes.

References

 Bail & Poppe. 2004. A conchological iconography. The tribe Lyriini. In ConchBooks : 1–93.
 Bouchet, P.; Fontaine, B. (2009). List of new marine species described between 2002-2006. Census of Marine Life.

External links

Volutidae
Gastropods described in 2004